Abdul Jabbar Naeemi (Dari and ) is an Afghan diplomat and politician. He served as the governor of Laghman Province in Afghanistan, and before that was governor  Khost province and Maidan Wardak province of Afghanistan.  At one time he served as a representative from Kandahar Province to the Loya Jirga (Grand Assembly). In 2004 he was Hamid Karzai's election agent in Pakistan, where he campaigned for Karzai and worked on educating local Afghans about the democratic process.

After the presidential elections, Naeemi became the Governor of Wardak Province, which is located 30 kilometers west of Kabul. Since taking up this position he has received credit for re-establishing order in the province, a former Taliban stronghold, and for drastically reducing the cultivation of opium.

He is a follower of the Pashtun spiritual leader Pir Sayed Ahmed Gailani, and a member of Gailani's National Islamic Front party.

In early 2010 Abdul was appointed governor of Khost Province.

References

Living people
Afghan diplomats
National Islamic Front of Afghanistan politicians
Governors of Khost Province
Governors of Maidan Wardak Province
1967 births
Afghan expatriates in Pakistan